My Grandma's Basement is the debut studio album by American rapper Jarren Benton. The album was released on June 11, 2013, through Funk Volume and was supported by the single "Razor Blades and Steak Knives". The album features guest appearances from Dizzy Wright, Hopsin, RA the Rugged Man, SwizZz, Vinnie Paz among others, along with production from Kato, SMKA, Planet VI, and Spitzwell among others.

Background 
After releasing three mixtapes, The Beatgods Present Jarren Benton, Huffing Glue With Hasslehoff and Freebasing With Kevin Bacon, Jarren Benton signed to Hopsin's record label Funk Volume and begun work on his debut album, which would be titled, My Grandma's Basement. Benton explained his mindset going into his debut album saying, "This album has a different vibe. It’s a lot more personal stuff so people can learn who Jarren is." He also said it will feature a more refined production sound that translates more to his ambitions of being a household name.

Release and promotion 
In late 2012, Benton toured internationally with Funk Volume label mates, Hopsin, Dizzy Wright, SwizZz and DJ Hoppa for two-months, which included 54 shows in 60 days in the United States, Europe, and Australia. Following the album's release, he released music videos for multiple songs including "Go Off", "Life In the Jungle" and "We On (My Own Dick)" among others. From August 1–19, 2013 Benton toured the United States on the Grandma's Basement Tour, his first solo headlining tour.

Commercial performance 
My Grandma's Basement debuted and peaked at number 152 on the Billboard 200 and number four on the Billboard Heatseekers Albums chart.

Critical reception 

My Grandma's Basement was met with generally positive reviews from music critics. AllMusic gave the album a three out of five star rating saying, "With most of his lyrics lapsing into the violent specifics of how he deals with the people who cross him, but as much as shock value plays a role in the rhymes, unlike similar-minded artists like Earl Sweatshirt and the Odd Future crew, Benton's brand of horrorcore features trap beats that are made for booming speakers rather than creeping out listeners." Homer Johnsen of HipHopDX also gave a three out of five star review stating, "Benton’s array of flows is very impressive, but his rhymes are oftentimes more for shock value than true creativity. For some, this will likely limit the album’s replay value. It is as if his darker motives are justified by these flashes of artistic ingenuity, and his occasional touches of humor keep the listener interested."

Track listing

Charts

References 

2013 debut albums
Jarren Benton albums
Funk Volume albums